Sammilana is a 1994 Indian Kannada-language film, directed by H. R. Bhargava and produced by S A Chinne Gowda and S A Srinivas. The film stars Shashikumar, Shruti, K. S. Ashwath and Sudheer in lead roles. The film had musical score by Hamsalekha. The film was adapted from novel of same name written by Sai Suthe.

Cast

Shashikumar
Shruti
K. S. Ashwath
Tara
Sudheer
Sathyajith
Aravind
Prithviraj
Balaraj
Nagesh Yadav
Abhinaya
Baby Aishwarya
Pandari Bai
Girija Lokesh
B. V. Radha
Rekha Das
Jaya
Bhagyashree
Madhavi
Veena
Asha
Rathna
Honnavalli Krishna
Bank Janardhan
Chikkanna
Shani Mahadevappa
Kunigal Nagabhushan
Ashwath Narayan
Vijanath Biradar
Kunigal Ramanath

References

1994 films
1990s Kannada-language films
Films scored by Hamsalekha
Films based on Indian novels
Films directed by H. R. Bhargava